Olav V (born Prince Alexander of Denmark; 2 July 1903 – 17 January 1991) was King of Norway from 1957 until his death in 1991.

Olav was the only child of King Haakon VII of Norway and Maud of Wales. He became heir apparent to the Norwegian throne when his father was elected King of Norway in 1905. He was the first heir to the Norwegian throne to be brought up in Norway since Olav IV in the fourteenth century, and his parents made sure he was given as Norwegian an upbringing as possible. In preparation for his future role, he attended both civilian and military schools. In 1929, he married his first cousin Princess Märtha of Sweden. During World War II his leadership was much appreciated and he was appointed Norwegian Chief of Defence in 1944. Olav became king following the death of his father in 1957.

Owing to his considerate, down-to-earth style, King Olav was immensely popular, resulting in the nickname  ('The People's King'). In a 2005 poll by the Norwegian Broadcasting Corporation, Olav was voted "Norwegian of the Century".

Birth and early life

Olav was born as Prince Alexander Edward Christian Frederik in Appleton House on the royal Sandringham Estate, Flitcham, United Kingdom. His parents were Prince Carl, second son of Crown Prince Frederick of Denmark (later King Frederick VIII), and Princess Maud, youngest daughter of King Edward VII of the United Kingdom, who was the eldest son of Britain's Queen Victoria. In 1905, Carl was elected King of Norway and took the name Haakon VII. On the day Haakon was crowned, he gave his two-year-old son the Norwegian name Olav after Olaf Haakonsson, king of Norway and Denmark.

Olav was thus the first heir to the throne since the Middle Ages to have been raised in Norway. Unlike his father, who was a naval officer, Olav chose to complete his main military education in the army. He graduated from the three-year Norwegian Military Academy in 1924, with the fourth best score in his class. Olav then went on to study jurisprudence and economics for two years at Balliol College, Oxford.

During the 1930s, Crown Prince Olav was a naval cadet serving on the minelayer/cadet training ship Olav Tryggvason. Olav moved up the ranks of the Norwegian armed forces, rising in the army from an initial rank of first lieutenant to captain in 1931 and colonel in 1936.

He was an accomplished athlete. Olav jumped from the Holmenkollen ski jump in Oslo and competed in sailing regattas. He won a gold medal in sailing at the 1928 Summer Olympics in Amsterdam and remained an active sailor into old age.

On 21 March 1929 in Oslo, he married his first cousin Princess Märtha of Sweden with whom he had two daughters, Ragnhild and Astrid and one son, Harald. As exiles during World War II, Crown Princess Märtha and the royal children lived in Washington, D.C., where she struck up a close friendship with Franklin D. Roosevelt. She died in 1954, before her husband ascended the throne.

The British Film Institute houses an early film, made in 1913, in which a miniature car (a "baby Cadillac") commissioned by Queen Alexandra for Crown Prince Olav tows a procession of Londoners through the streets of the capital, before being delivered to a pair of "royal testers" of roughly Olav's age. The car is a battery-powered, one-third size replica on a four-foot wheelbase, and is on permanent loan to the Norsk Teknisk Museum in Oslo.

World War II

As Crown Prince, Olav had received extensive military training and had participated in most major Norwegian military exercises. Because of this he was perhaps one of the most knowledgeable Norwegian military leaders  and was respected by other Allied leaders for his knowledge and leadership skills. During a visit to the United States before the war, he and his wife had established a close relationship with President Roosevelt. These factors would prove to be important for the Norwegian fight against the attacking German forces. In 1939, Crown Prince Olav was appointed an admiral of the Royal Norwegian Navy and a general of the Norwegian Army.

During World War II, Olav stood by his father's side in resisting the German occupation of Norway. During the campaign he was a valuable advisor both to civilian and military leaders. When the Norwegian government decided to go into exile, he offered to stay behind with the Norwegian people, but this was declined. He reluctantly followed his father to the United Kingdom, where he and his staff and servants and aides continued to be a key advisor to the government-in-exile and his father. One source states that Olav helped "to build and lead a free fighting force" and made radio broadcasts" while in England. Olav made several visits to Norwegian and Allied troops in the United Kingdom, Canada and the United States. In 1944, he was appointed to the post of Norwegian Chief of Defence and after the war he led the Norwegian disarmament of the German occupying forces.  On 13 May 1945 Crown Prince Olav and five government ministers returned to a liberated Norway. The arrival was documented in a newsreel by British Pathé News.

His war decorations from other nations, including the War Crosses of Norway, France, Greece and the Netherlands, the US Legion of Merit and the French Médaille Militaire, are testament to the international recognition of his contribution to the war against Hitler.

Reign

Haakon was injured in an accident in 1955; his son Olav served as regent until his death. Haakon died at the Royal Palace in Oslo on 21 September 1957. He was 85 years old. After his death, Olav succeeded him as Olav V. 

Olav reigned as a "People's King," and became extremely popular, despite the fact that he had no queen consort (he was a widower throughout his reign). He liked to drive his own cars, and would drive in the public lanes, even though as a monarch he was allowed to drive in bus lanes. When driving was restricted during the 1973 energy crisis, King Olav – who could have driven legally – wanted to lead by example; while preparing for a skiing trip, he dressed up in his skiing outfit and boarded the Holmenkollbanen suburban railway carrying his skis on his shoulder. When later asked how he dared to go out in public without bodyguards, he replied that "he had 4 million bodyguards" – the population of Norway was at the time 4 million.

For his athletic ability and role as King, Olav earned the Holmenkollen medal in 1968, the Medal for Outstanding Civic Achievement in 1970 and was made Name of the Year in 1975. He had a strong interest in military matters and took his role as titular Commander-in-Chief very seriously. As well as his ceremonial roles in the Norwegian Army, he also served as Colonel-in-Chief of the Green Howards (Alexandra, Princess of Wales's Yorkshire Regiment), the British regiment named for his grandmother Queen Alexandra.

The King represented Norway extensively abroad during his reign, conducting state visits to both neighbouring countries and more distant destinations such as Ethiopia and Iran. King Olav V opened the 14th World Scout Jamboree in July 1975 in the presence of 17,259 Scouts from 94 countries.

Although the constitution nominally vested Olav with executive power, he was not responsible for exercising it. One source states that his "duties were largely ceremonial". His acts were not valid without the countersignature of a minister–usually the Prime Minister–who then became politically responsible for the act in question. He had the right to appoint the government, but in practice it was not possible for him to keep a government in office against the will of the Storting. Thus, in practice, his role was mostly representative in nature. Nonetheless, like his father before him, he commanded great moral authority as a symbol of the nation's unity.

Illness and death
During the summer of 1990, the King suffered from health problems, but recovered somewhat during Christmas the same year. At the age of 87, on 17 January 1991, while residing in the Royal Lodge Kongsseteren in Oslo, he became ill and died in the evening of a myocardial infarction. An interview given by King Harald V and hints in a biography by Jo Benkow, who was the President of the Storting at that time, mention the possibility that King Olav suffered great trauma upon learning of the outbreak of the first Gulf War, which began on the day he died. Olav's son Harald V succeeded him as King.

On the night of his death and for several days up until the state funeral, Norwegians mourned publicly, lighting hundreds of thousands of candles in the courtyard outside the Royal Palace in Oslo, with letters and cards placed amongst them. The National Archives have preserved all these cards.

Funeral 
The state funeral of King Olav V was held on 30 January 1991. During the funeral procession from the Royal Palace to Oslo Cathedral, over 100,000 people lined up along Karl Johans gate to pay their respects. Prime Minister Gro Harlem Brundtland gave the eulogy at the funeral, before the casket was moved to Akershus Fortress where a private service was held.

Olav was finally laid to rest next to his wife Märtha in the green sarcophagus of the Royal Mausoleum.

Legacy 
King Olav's leadership during the Second World War made him a symbol of Norwegian independence and national unity. As King Olav's wife, Princess Märtha, died of cancer, the King Olav V's Prize for Cancer Research was established in 1992.

A 2005 poll by the Norwegian Broadcasting Corporation named King Olav "Norwegian of the Century".

In popular culture 
Viktor Andersen portrayed the two-year-old Prince Alexander (Olav) in the 2009 NRK drama series Harry & Charles. Actor Anders Baasmo Christiansen was chosen to portray Crown Prince Olav in the 2016 drama The King's Choice while Tobias Santelmann portrayed Olav in the 2021 NRK drama Atlantic Crossing.

Honours

National honours and medals
 :
 Recipient of the War Cross
 Recipient of the Medal for Outstanding Civic Achievement in gold
 Grand Cross with Collar of the Royal Norwegian Order of St Olav (18 November 1905); Grand Master (21 September 1957)
 Founder of the Royal Norwegian Order of Merit (1985)
 Recipient of the St Olav's medal
 Recipient of the Haakon VII Coronation Medal
 Recipient of the War Medal
 Recipient of the Haakon VII 70th Anniversary Medal
 Recipient of the King Haakon VII 1905–1955 Jubilee Medal

Foreign honours
 : Grand Cross with Collar of the Order of the Liberator General San Martin
 : Grand Star of the Decoration of Honour for Services to the Republic of Austria
 : Grand Cordon of the Order of Leopold
 : Grand Cross with Collar of the Order of the Rose
 : Grand Cross with Collar of the Order of the Merit of Chile
 :
 Knight of the Elephant (13 August 1921)
 Cross of Honour of the Order of the Dannebrog (13 August 1921)
 Grand Commander of the Order of the Dannebrog (11 September 1958)
 Recipient of the King Christian X's Liberty Medal
 Recipient of the Commemorative Medal for King Christian IX's 100th birthday
 Recipient of the Commemorative Medal for King Frederik VIII's 100th birthday
 : Grand Cross of the Order of Solomon
 : Grand Cross of the Order of the White Rose
 : 
 Grand Cross of the Order of Legion of Honour
 Recipient of the Croix de guerre
 Recipient of the Médaille militaire
 : Grand Cross Special Class of the Order of Merit of the Federal Republic of Germany
 :
 Grand Cross of the Order of the Redeemer
 Grand Cross of the Order of St. George and St. Constantine
 Recipient of the War Cross
 Recipient of the Commemorative Badge of the Centenary of the Royal House of Greece
 :
 Grand Cross with Collar of the Order of the Falcon (1961)
 Grand Cross of the Order of the Falcon (1955)
 :
 Grand Cordon of the Order of Pahlavi
 Commemorative Medal of the 2500th Anniversary of the founding of the Persian Empire (14/10/1971).
 : Knight Grand cross with Collar of the Order of Merit of the Italian Republic (1965)
 : Collar of the Order of the Chrysanthemum
 : Knight of the Order of the Gold Lion of the House of Nassau
 : Grand Cross of the Order of the Aztec Eagle
 :
 Grand Cross of the Order of the Netherlands Lion
 Grand Cross of the Order of the House of Orange
 Recipient of the War Cross
 Recipient of the Queen Juliana Juliana Inauguration Medal (1948)
 : Grand Cross of the Order of the Sun
 :
 Grand Cross of the Military Order of Aviz
 Grand Collar of the Order of Saint James of the Sword
 : Knight Grand Cross of the Order of the Star
 : Grand Cross of the Ernestine Order (Saxony, Germany)
 :
 Knight of the Order of the Golden Fleece
 Collar of the Order of Charles III
 :
 Knight of the Royal Order of the Seraphim (1 November 1926)
 Recipient of the 70th Birthday Medal of King Gustaf V (1928)
 Recipient of the 90th Birthday Medal of King Gustaf V (1948) King Gustaf V's 90th Anniversary Medal
 :
 Knight of the Most Illustrious Order of the Royal House of Chakri (19 September 1960) 
 Knight Grand Cordon (Special Class) of the Most Illustrious Order of Chula Chom Klao
 : Grand Cross of the Order of Independence
 : Collar of the Order of Pope Pius IX (1967)
 :
 Knight Companion of the Most Noble Order of the Garter (29 May 1959)
 Extra Knight of the Most Ancient and Most Noble Order of the Thistle
 Knight Grand Cross of the Most Honourable Order of the Bath
 Recipient of the Royal Victorian Chain
 Knight Grand Cross of the Royal Victorian Order
 Recipient of the King George V Silver Jubilee Medal
 Recipient of the King George VI Coronation Medal
 Recipient of the Queen Elizabeth II Coronation Medal
 : Chief Commander of the Legion of Merit
 : Great Star of the Order of the Yugoslav Star

Other honours
  – A 180 000 km2 area (Prince Olav Coast) and the Prince Olav Mountains in Antarctica are named in his honour.
  – Olav V Land on Svalbard is named in his honour.
  – In 1961 the King was a laureate of the Nansen Refugee Award.
  – In 1968 he was awarded the Holmenkollen medal.
  – In 2005, Olav was proclaimed the Norwegian of the Century, with 41 percent of the tele-votes in a popular competition held by NRK.
  – In 1959, Olav was granted the honorary rank of Air Chief Marshal in the Royal Air Force.
  – In 1958, Olav was granted the honorary rank of Admiral in the Royal Navy, and in 1988, he was granted the honorary rank of Admiral of the Fleet.
  – Honorary Freeman of Richmond
  – Honorary Freedom of Newcastle upon Tyne
  – Prince Olav Harbour on South Georgia is also named in his honour.

  – Member of the Independent Order of Odd Fellows.
 , SR Macedonia - In 1966, Olav became an honorary citizen.

Issue

Gallery

Notes

References

Bibliography

External links

 Official Website of the Royal House of Norway
 King Olav – biography (Official Website of the Royal House of Norway)
 The Royal Norwegian Order of St Olav – H.M. King Olav V the former Grand Master of the Order
 Holmenkollen medalists – click Holmenkollmedaljen for downloadable pdf file 
 

1903 births
1991 deaths
20th-century Norwegian monarchs
Norwegian monarchs
House of Glücksburg (Norway)
Norwegian people of World War II
Danish princes
Norwegian princes
Norwegian male ski jumpers
Norwegian male sailors (sport)
Olympic sailors of Norway
Sailors at the 1928 Summer Olympics – 6 Metre
Olympic gold medalists for Norway
Norwegian Military Academy alumni
Alumni of Balliol College, Oxford
Norwegian Army generals
Royal Norwegian Navy admirals
Crown Princes of Norway
Protestant monarchs
Royal Olympic medalists
Royal Air Force officers holding honorary commissions
Holmenkollen medalists
Knights Grand Cross of the Order of Orange-Nassau
Knights of the Golden Fleece of Spain
Chief Commanders of the Legion of Merit
Recipients of the Croix de Guerre (France)
Grand Croix of the Légion d'honneur
Collars of the Order of the Liberator General San Martin
Recipients of the Grand Star of the Decoration for Services to the Republic of Austria
Grand Crosses of the Order of Saints George and Constantine
Recipients of the War Cross (Greece)
Grand Crosses of the Order of the House of Orange
Grand Crosses of the Order of the Sun of Peru
Grand Crosses of the Order of Aviz
Grand Collars of the Order of Saint James of the Sword
Grand Crosses of the Order of the Star of Romania
Honorary Knights of the Thistle
Honorary Knights Grand Cross of the Order of the Bath
Honorary Knights Grand Cross of the Royal Victorian Order
Extra Knights Companion of the Garter
Grand Commanders of the Order of the Dannebrog
Recipients of the Cross of Honour of the Order of the Dannebrog
Knights Grand Cross of the Order of Chula Chom Klao
Recipients of the St. Olav's Medal
Recipients of the War Cross (Norway)
Norwegian people of German descent
Norwegian people of English descent
Burials at the Royal Mausoleum (Norway)
Royal Navy admirals of the fleet
Olympic medalists in sailing
Norwegian Army World War II generals
Royal Norwegian Navy World War II admirals
Medalists at the 1928 Summer Olympics
Grand Crosses Special Class of the Order of Merit of the Federal Republic of Germany
Sons of kings
Nansen Refugee Award laureates
Recipients of orders, decorations, and medals of Ethiopia